Eugène-René Arsal (3 August 1884 - 14 November 1972) was a French sculptor.

Biography
 
Eugène-René Arsal was born on the 3rd of August 1884 in Paris. He was a student of Aristide Maillol and Hector Lemaire. He installed his workshop in Vincennes and presented his works in the Salon des artistes français from 1905 to 1939. Arsal was a member of the Société des artistes français, and he got an Honorable mention in 1923 at the Salon des artistes français.

He died on 14 November 1972 in Vincennes.

References

French artists
1884 births
1972 deaths